Clarence M. Palmer (October 6, 1943 Princeton, West Virginia) is an American jazz organist.

After initially learning gospel piano, Palmer switched to jazz organ upon hearing the early 1960s Jimmy Smith approach to the instrument which was then gaining in popularity. Palmer appeared frequently as a sideman with various recording artists in 1960s and 1970s,  chiefly Grant Green, George Benson, and Fats Theus. Today he presents various ensembles under his own leadership. His most commercially successful recording was with Benson on the 1971 CTI release, Beyond the Blue Horizon.

Discography

With George Benson
Beyond the Blue Horizon (CTI, 1971)

With Grant Green
Carryin' On (Blue Note, 1969)

With Fats Theus
Blackout (CTI, 1970)

References

1943 births
American jazz organists
American male organists
20th-century American musicians
Musicians from Charleston, West Virginia
Living people
21st-century organists
20th-century American male musicians
21st-century American male musicians
American male jazz musicians
21st-century American keyboardists
People from Princeton, West Virginia